KFUM Jönköping is an YMCA association in Jönköping in Sweden, established in 1855. By the late 1980s and early 1990s the volleyboll team experienced a successful period, playing in Elitserien at both the men's and women's sides.

References

External links
Official website 

1855 establishments in Sweden
Swedish volleyball clubs
Jon
Sport in Jönköping
Religious organizations based in Sweden